Henry County Savings Bank is a historic building located in Mount Pleasant, Iowa, United States.  Because this two story, brick Italianate structure was built specifically as a bank, it features a chamfered corner, which was commonly used to designate a bank in the last quarter of the 19th century.  Other features typical of an Italianate commercial building include segmental arched windows, a corbeled brick frieze, and a bracketed metal cornice.  The building was listed on the National Register of Historic Places in 1991.

References

Commercial buildings completed in 1891
Buildings and structures in Mount Pleasant, Iowa
National Register of Historic Places in Henry County, Iowa
Bank buildings on the National Register of Historic Places in Iowa
Italianate architecture in Iowa